MPT may refer to:

Chemistry
 Methylpropyltryptamine, a psychedelic tryptamine
 Molybdopterin, a component of molybdenum cofactor
 Tetrahydromethanopterin, the coenzyme H4MPT

Organizations
 Maryland Public Television, the public television broadcaster for Maryland, USA 
 Master Piano Technicians of America (MPT), an association of professional piano technicians
 Meta Peace Team, formerly Michigan Peace Team, a US-based nonviolent activist organization
 Ministry of Posts and Telecommunications, an agency in several governments
 Myanma Posts and Telecommunications (MPT), a state-owned internet service provider in Myanmar/Burma 
 Mormugao Port Trust, a port in Goa, India.
 Togolese People's Movement
 Partido da Terra (MPT, from its former name Movimento Partido da Terra), a Portuguese Green party
 Midpoint (MPT), a currency exchange company.

Other
 Master of Physical Therapy, a post-baccalaureate professional degree conferred upon physical therapists
 Metroid Prime: Trilogy
 Microwave Power Transmission, see Microwave transmission#Microwave power transmission
 Modern portfolio theory, a mathematical framework used in finance
 ModPlug Tracker, tracker software
 Morpeth railway station, England; National Rail station code MPT
 Multistate Performance Test in US bar (law) examination
 Master partition table
 Mid-Pleistocene Transition, a change of glacial periodicity in Quaternary geology
 MKE MPT, Turkish assault rifle